James Hill (August 1, 1916 – January 11, 2001) was an American film producer and screenwriter active from the late 1940s to the mid-1960s. He was born in Indianapolis, Indiana and came to Hollywood as a writer, working on films and televisions shows for Warner Brothers Pictures and Columbia Broadcasting System. He was eventually teamed with film producer Harold Hecht and actor Burt Lancaster when the pair produced His Majesty O'Keefe for their own film production company, Norma Productions. The movie was filmed in 1952 in the Fiji Islands, but only released in 1954.

In 1953, Hecht and Lancaster formed the imprint Hecht-Lancaster Productions and began producing films for United Artists, hiring Hill as producer for Vera Cruz, The Kentuckian and Trapeze. In early 1956, before Trapeze was released, Lancaster and Hecht announced in a press conference that Hill had been made an equal partner in their film production company; Hecht-Lancaster Productions would be changing name to Hecht-Hill-Lancaster Productions at the start of the next fiscal year in January 1957. From 1954 to 1959, the Norma Productions subsidiaries Hecht-Lancaster Productions and later Hecht-Hill-Lancaster Productions, were the biggest and most important independent production units in Hollywood.

Hill was the fifth and final husband of actress Rita Hayworth, married from 1958 to 1961. The pair met when Hayworth was filming Hecht-Hill-Lancaster Productions' Separate Tables. Like Hayworth, he developed Alzheimer's disease. He died in Santa Monica, California in 2001.

Filmography

References

External links 

1916 births
2001 deaths
American chief executives
American film producers
American male screenwriters
Businesspeople from California
Businesspeople from Indiana
Film producers from California
Film producers from Indiana
Norma Productions people
Screenwriters from California
Screenwriters from Indiana
20th-century American screenwriters